"I'm a Realist" is the fourth and final single from the third album by British indie rock band The Cribs, released in February 2008. Men's Needs, Women's Needs, Whatever, released in May 2007, featured three other commercially successful and critically lauded songs in the form of 'Men's Needs', 'Moving Pictures' and 'Our Bovine Public'. Recorded at the Warehouse Studio in Vancouver, British Columbia with Franz Ferdinand vocalist and guitarist Alex Kapranos, the song received mastering treatment at Alchemy, London, United Kingdom.

Physical release
The song received a physical release on seven inch vinyl and digital download. Frequent band collaborator Nick Scott designed the sleeve, with the release featuring the catalogue number 'WEBB163S'.

B-Sides

The seven inch vinyl b-side featured a cover of 'Bastards of Young' by The Replacements, a group that the Jarman brothers have long admired. Bernard Butler produced the song, recorded at West Heath Studios, London. A remix of the single by the Postal Service also features on the rare North American version of the vinyl, available only at the dates on that continental tour in 2008.

Miscellaneous

The song came backed with a sticker of the band and therefore made the release chart ineligible due to BPI restrictions. The music video features a 'doomed' rendezvous between two friends at a Cribs concert, with the protagonist succumbing to death in the bath via a falling plant pot. The band make a fleeting appearance at the end of the video.

Track listings

Footnotes

External links
official band website
official record label website

2008 singles
The Cribs songs
Songs written by Gary Jarman
Songs written by Ross Jarman
Songs written by Ryan Jarman
2008 songs
Wichita Recordings singles